The 2012 GCC U-17 Championship will take place in Kuwait from September 22 - October 1. It is the 9th edition of the tournament.

Groups

The draw for the championships took place on 30 June 2012.

Group stage

Group A

Group B

Semi finals

Third place playoff

Final

Winners

References

Gulf
2012
GCC U-17 Championship
2012 in youth association football